Between My Head and the Sky is an album by Yoko Ono's band Plastic Ono Band released on Chimera Music in September 2009. It is her first studio album to be released as "Yoko Ono/Plastic Ono Band" since 1973's Feeling the Space. This Plastic Ono Band lineup featured Cornelius, Yuka Honda (of Cibo Matto fame), and Ono's son Sean Lennon as band leader and producer.

Reception 

New Internationalist magazine described the album as "fresh and challenging as any of her early work" and having "a commitment to spontaneity".

Track listing 
All songs written by Yoko Ono.
 "Waiting for the D Train" – 2:46
 "The Sun Is Down! (Cornelius Mix)" – 4:49
 "Ask the Elephant!" – 2:57
 "Memory of Footsteps" – 3:30
 "Moving Mountains" – 3:00
 "CALLING" – 4:19
 "Healing" – 4:25
 "Hashire, Hashire" – 3:35
 "BETWEEN MY HEAD AND THE SKY" – 5:33
 "Feel the Sand" – 6:02
 "Watching the Rain" – 5:30
 "Unun. To" – 3:16
 "I'm Going Away Smiling" – 2:53
 "Higa Noboru" – 5:44
 "I'm Alive" – 0:22

Japanese Bonus Track
 "Hanako" – 1:54

Japanese iTunes Bonus Video
 "Why" (Live at Royal Festival Hall, London 2009) – 5:08

Note
Digital and Streaming editions of the album omit the last 2 tracks, instead ending the album with the track "I'm Going Away Smiling."

Personnel
Yoko Ono – vocals
Sean Lennon – acoustic and electric guitars, piano, keyboards, bass guitar, drums, percussion
Keigo Oyamada – guitars, bass guitar, Tenorion, programming, percussion
Hirotaka Shimizu – guitars, percussion
Yuko Araki – drums, percussion
Shahzad Ismaily – guitars, bass guitar, drums, percussion
Yuka Honda – Pro-tools editing, sampler, e. piano, organ, percussion
Michael Leonhart – trumpet, vibraphone, percussion
Erik Friedlander – cello
Daniel Carter – tenor saxophone, flute
Indigo Street – guitar
Technical
Chief Engineer: Christopher Allen
Assistant Engineer: Dave Schoenwetter
Recorded & Mixed at Sear Sound
Mastered by Greg Calbi at Sterling Sound
Mixer of "Waiting for the D Train": Joel Hamilton
Cover and booklet design: Sean Lennon and Charlotte Kemp Muhl
Photographs: Greg Kadel

Release history

References

2009 albums
Yoko Ono albums
Plastic Ono Band albums
Avant-pop albums